Jarrahdale is a small historic town located 45 km south-east of Perth, Western Australia in the Darling Range. The name is derived from its situation in a jarrah forest. Established in the late 1800s as the state's first major timber milling operation, it played a key role in the development of Western Australia through the exportation of jarrah around the world. At the 2016 census, Jarrahdale had a population of 1,192. Since 2001, the historic precinct has been managed by the state's National Trust organisation alongside private residential and tourism-oriented developments.

History
The Jarrahdale Timber Company constructed a railway for the transport of timber from Jarrahdale through Mundijong to Rockingham. In 1872 the townsite was granted timber concessions and the town was born, though it was not gazetted until 1913.

The locality was destroyed by an 1895 bushfire. and the town was relocated west of its original position.

Historic buildings in the area include a mill manager's house, nurses' quarters/hospital, general store, single men's quarters, Gianatti store, Murray Arms/Jarrahdale Tavern/Rileys Bar, churches, post office and other buildings. A POW camp was located outside the town during World War II. Recently the old mill office, behind the nurses' quarters, was destroyed by fire, a recurring hazard throughout the township's history.

The population of the town was 600 (400 males and 200 females) in 1898.

Bauxite had been mined by Western Aluminium near Jarrahdale throughout the 1960s. The ore was transported by rail to Kwinana for processing at the company's Alumina refinery. In 1967 the company had mined  of bauxite.

On 14 July 1997, the Jarrahdale townsite was entered on the National Trust's List of Classified Heritage places, the seventh Western Australian town to be so classified.

The Shire of Serpentine-Jarrahdale instigated a redevelopment scheme for the Jarrahdale Heritage Park which houses the previous mill sites and the last standing mill built in the 1930s. This mill is still operating as a small production business called Heritage Sawmillers, located on the Gooralong Brook which flows through the townsite. Following negotiations with the landowners Wesfarmers/Sotico, the shire purchased some of the land for housing development and, in 2001, an entire historic precinct was donated to National Trust of Australia (WA), including the site of a closed timber sawmill.

Surviving relics
On the main pass road, Jarrahdale Road, are located the successive mill sites and, to the extremity of the town heading east, the last mill site which still contains relics of its existence. This mill was operated by Bunnings until 1997. An Alcoa alumina mining operation was concluded in 1998. Both Bunnings and Alcoa removed most of their plant fittings when they departed.

The surrounding area includes catchments and steep slopes with remnants of the former native forest, e.g., near the Kitty's Gorge walk trail within the Serpentine National Park. In 2009, the Forest Products Commission announced plans for renewed logging in the vicinity, plotting 50-year-old regrowth sites east of the townsite.

There were once many timber mills in the jarrah forest surrounding Jarrahdale, some of which were flooded when the Serpentine Dam was constructed in 1957–61. Railway formations and cuttings are indicators of past development. "By the 1900s, Jarrahdale had a town population of about 1200 people while 800 more were housed in surrounding bush landings and remote sites." From 1925 until 1927, a portable school was established in a building mounted on railway trucks, so that it could be easily transported by forestry train from one work camp to another, as timber-cutters and their families moved through the forest.

See also
 3rd Night
 1961 Western Australian bushfires
 Mundijong, Western Australia
 South Western Highway

References

Further reading
Jarrahdale Heritage Park at Natural Heritage site of the National Trust (W.A.)
Welcome to Jarrahdale Tourism promotion site

External links
 Jarrahdale Museum and history at Jarrahdale Heritage Society
 Mill Manager's Residence Assessment documentation for entry to Register of Heritage Places, at W.A. Heritage Council, 14 May 1999  
 Suburb Profile for Jarrahdale -  Real Estate Institute of WA

Towns in Western Australia
Mining towns in Western Australia
Shire of Serpentine-Jarrahdale